Ariel Agustín Sant’Anna Quintero (born 27 September 1997) is a Uruguayan footballer who plays as a defender for Deportivo Maldonado in the Uruguayan Primera División.

References

Uruguayan footballers
Uruguay youth international footballers
Association football defenders
1997 births
Living people
C.A. Cerro players
Club Nacional de Football players
Deportivo Maldonado players
Uruguayan Primera División players